Piano Sonata No. 7 may refer to: 
Piano Sonata No. 7 (Beethoven)
Piano Sonata No. 7 (Mozart)
Piano Sonata No. 7 (Prokofiev)
Piano Sonata No. 7 (Scriabin)